Howard Little (February 12, 1842 – January 7, 1911) was an American artist.  A native of North Carolina, he spent the last year of his life in Geneva, Switzerland.

Born in Pinehurst, North Carolina, raised in Southern Pines, and an alumnus of the University of North Carolina at Chapel Hill, Little took up drawing at 18. In 1884 he began teaching illustration, and after 1897 founded a school, where his students included F.G. Stevenson.

His 1883 classic The Dance of the Damned remains in print, and his other books, frequently with fiery depictions of Hell, included a four-volume set on the Devil.

1842 births
1911 deaths
University of North Carolina at Chapel Hill alumni
People from Pinehurst, North Carolina
People from Southern Pines, North Carolina